The Perth Dance Music Awards (also known as "the PDMAs") highlights the year's major accomplishments in Electronic music by Western Australians.
It is an annual event, with the first awards held in 1998. The Perth Dance Music Awards aim to provide recognition and reward to those who are the best in their chosen fields with in the Perth electronic music scene. The recipients of the awards are voted for by the public.

With over 25 categories covering all niches and genres within the scene, the PDMAs recognise excellence and innovation, highlighting the tireless effort and limitless passion expended by the hard working individuals and organisations that make Perth’s dance music scene what it is today.

2013 Awards
The 2013 Awards were held on Sunday 8 December at the Court Hotel.

Winners
 Best House DJ Manimal
 Best Tech House DJ Flex
 Best Electro DJ Kill Dyl
 Best Techno DJ Craig Hollywood
 Best Progressive DJ Jason Creek
 Best Trance DJ Illuminor
 Best Dubstep DJ Killafoe
 Best Drum n Bass DJ VLTRN
 Best Breaks DJ Philly Blunt
 Best Hip Hop DJ Angry Buda
 Best Female DJ Gracie
 Best Hard Dance DJ Rinski
 Best Hardcore DJ DJ Ol Bill
 Best Commercial Club DJ Timbee
 Best Regional DJ Panda
 Best New Talent Maker
 Best MC Stylee
 Best Producer Philly Blunt
 Best Local Tune Philly Blunt – Nick Lynar – True Love (Philly Blunt remix)
 Best Record Label JD4D records
 Best Club Night Japan 4
 Best Hardstyle DJ Outtacontrol
 Best Nightclub Ambar
 Best Radio Show Full Frequency
 Best Event Breakfest
 Best Flyer Breakfest 2012 – Jarrod Fuller & Boomtick
 Best Scene Photograph Photo 1 – Adam Mazur – A$AP ROCKY, Metro City
 Outstanding Contribution Inhibit

Hall of Fame Inductees
 Jeremy Junk
 John “Gully” Rodgers
 Petar Ceklic

2012 Awards
 Best House DJ – El Dario
 Best Tech-House DJ – Flex
 Best Electro DJ – Kill Dyl
 Best Techno DJ – Craig Hollywood
 Best Dubstep DJ – JD4D
 Best Drum & Bass DJ – Voltron
 Best Hip-Hop DJ – Angry Buda
 Best Urban/R&B DJ – Angry Buda
 Best Female DJ – Gracie
 Best Breaks DJ – Micah
 Best Progressive DJ – Jason Creek 
 Best Trance DJ – GeRmAn
  Best Hardcore DJ – Camzor
  Best Hardstyle DJ – DJ Outtacontrol
 Best Hard Dance DJ – Damien Blaze
 Best New Talent – Poseidon
 Best MC – MC Assassin
 Best Live Act – The Brow Horn Orchestra
 Best Producer – Killafoe
 Best Local Tunes – Black & Blunt - Moving Music
Illuminor -  That Way (Genix Dub Mix)
 Best Record Label – JD4D Records
 Best Club Night – Amon Vision
 Best Nightclub – Ambar
 Best Radio Show – Full Frequency (RTRFM)
 Best Dance Music Website – Teknoscape
 Best Event – Breakfest
 Best Flyer – Amon Vision (designed by Igor Kadic)
 Best International Performance – James Zabelia
 Best Photo – Breakfest - Adam Mazur
 Outstanding Contribution – Inhibit

2011 Awards
 Best House DJ – DJ Timbee
 Best Tech-House DJ – Flex
 Best Electro DJ – Kill Dyl
 Best Techno DJ – Craig Hollywood
 Best Dubstep DJ – Dr Space	
 Best Drum & Bass DJ – ShockOne
 Best Hip-Hop DJ – Angry Buda
 Best Urban/R&B DJ – DJ Skooby
 Best Female DJ – Mono Lisa
 Best Breaks DJ – Micah
 Best Progressive DJ – Progress Inn
 Best Trance DJ – Jason Creek
  Best Hardcore DJ – DJ Ol Bill
 Best Hard Dance DJ – Zimma
 Best New Talent – MR.eD
 Best MC – MC Assassin
 Best Live Act – The Brow Horn Orchestra
 Best Producer – ShockOne
 Best Local Tune – ShockOne feat. Phetsta - Crucify Me
 Best Record Label – Amon Vision
 Best Club Night – Japan 4
 Best Regular Weeknight – Beat Mash
 Best Nightclub – Ambar
 Best Radio Show – Full Frequency (RTRFM)
 Best Dance Music Website – Teknoscape
 Best Event – Breakfest
 Best Flyer – Breakfest (designed by Jarrod Fuller)
 Best International Performance – Nero (band)
 Best Photo – Atomic Hooligan & Rico Tubbs at Breakfest - James Gifford
 Outstanding Contribution – Habitat

2010 Awards
 Best House DJ – Paul Scott
 Best Tech-House DJ – Nathan Francis
 Best Electro DJ – Kill Dyl
 Best Techno DJ – Aarin F
 Best Dubstep DJ – Rekab
 Best Drum & Bass DJ – ShockOne
 Best Hip-Hop DJ – Angry Buda
 Best Urban/R&B DJ – DJ Skooby
 Best Female DJ – Mono Lisa
 Best Breaks DJ – Micah
 Best Progressive DJ – Progress Inn
 Best Trance DJ – Jason Creek
 ‘James H Trophy’ Best Hardcore DJ – Rousa
 Best Hard Dance DJ – Rousa
 Best New Talent – The Pearly Whites
 Best MC – Whiskey
 Best Live Act – The Brow Horn Orchestra
 Best Hip-Hop Act – The Brow Horn Orchestra
 Best Producer – ShockOne
 Best Local Tune – ShockOne, Phetsta & Metrik – True Believer (Phetsta’s Dubstep Rework)
 Best Record Label – Grits n Gravy
 Best Club Night – Japan 4
 Best Regular Weeknight – Beat Mash
 Best Nightclub – Ambar
 Best Radio Show – Full Frequency (RTRFM)
 Best Dance Music Website – Teknoscape
 Best Event – Breakfest
 Best All Ages Event – Glow
 Best International Performance – Miles Dyson
 Outstanding Contribution – Knowledge Music
 Best Scene Photograph – Andy C at Heavyweight Soundz – Angela King
 Best Flyer – Lucid Dreaming (designed by Igor Kadic)

Inaugural Hall of Fame Inductee
 Liam Mazzucchelli

2009 Awards
 Best House DJ – Kyran Smith
 Best Tech-House DJ – Flex
 Best Electro DJ – Sketchism
 Best Techno DJ – Darren J
 Best Dubstep DJ – Rekab
 Best Drum & Bass DJ – ShockOne
 Best Hip-Hop DJ – Charlie Bucket
 Best Urban/R&B DJ – Skooby
 Best Female DJ – Mono Lisa
 Best Breaks DJ – Micah
 Best Progressive DJ – Darren J
 Best Trance DJ – Jason Creek
 ‘James H Trophy’ Best Hardcore DJ – Rousa
 Best Hard Dance DJ – Beni C
 Best New Talent – Nathan Francis
 Best MC – MC Able
 Best Live Act – The Typhoons
 Best Hip-Hop Act – The Typhoons
 Best Downtempo / Electro / Other Producer – Shazam
 Best Broken Beat Producer – Shockone
 Best 4/4 Producer – Shazam
 Best Local Tune – ShockOne - Polygon feat. Reija Lee
 Best Record Label – Paper Chain
 Best Club Night – Japan4
 Best Regular Weeknight – Beatmash
 Best Nightclub – Ambar
 Best Bar/Pub Venue – Rosemount
 Best Non-Club Venue – Belvoir
 Best Record Retailer – Next Level Records
 Best Radio Show – Full Frequency (RTRFM)
 Best Dance Music Website – In The Mix
 Best All-Ages Rave – Damage Control
 Best Event – Breakfest
 Best Flyer – Breakfest
 Best International Performance – Armin Van Buuren
 Outstanding Contribution – Boomtick
 Best Photo – Trance Energy - Adam Mazur

2008 Awards
 Best House DJ – Ben Mac
 Best Electro DJ – Flex
 Best Techno DJ – Travis
 Best Drum & Bass DJ – ShockOne
 Best Hip-Hop DJ – Charlie Bucket
 Best Urban/R&B DJ – DJ Skooby
 Best Female DJ – Mono Lisa
 Best Breaks DJ – Micah
 Best Progressive DJ – Sean Chee
 Best Trance DJ – Simon Barwood
 'James H Trophy' Best Hardcore DJ – Rousa
 Best Hard Dance DJ – Beni C
 Best New Talent – Darren J
 Best MC – MC Tenacity
 Best Live Act – The Typhoons
 Best Hip-Hop Act – Downsyde
 Best Downtempo/Electro/Other Producer – Signal Drivers
 Best Broken Beat Producer – Shockone
 Best 4/4 Producer – Signal Drivers
 Best Local Tune – Phetsta & Shockone
 Best Record Label – Destination?
 Best Club Night – Japan 4
 Best Regular Weeknight – Beat Mash
 Best Nightclub – Ambar
 Best Bar/Pub Venue – Rosemount Hotel
 Best Non-Club Venue – Belvoir Amphitheatre
 Best Record Retailer – Next Level Records
 Best Radio Show – Full Frequency
 Best Dance Music Website – Teknoscape
 Best All-Ages Rave – Reset 3
 Best Event – Breakfest
 Best Flyer – Breakfest
 Best International Performance – Daft Punk
 Outstanding Contribution – Boomtick

2007 Awards
 Best House DJ – Ben Mac
 Best Electro DJ – Flex
 Best Techno DJ – Flaunt
 Best Drum & Bass DJ – Greg Packer
 Best Hip-Hop DJ – Armee
 Best Urban/R&B DJ – DJ Skooby
 Best Female DJ – Mono Lisa
 Best Breaks DJ – Micah
 Best Progressive DJ – Sean Chee
 Best Trance DJ – Simon Barwood
 Best Hardcore DJ – Rousa
 Best Hard House DJ – Weavy
 Best New Talent – Lyndon
 Best MC – Xsessiv
 Best Live Act – The Typhoons
 Best Hip-Hop Act – Downsyde
 Best Downtempo / Electro / Other Producer – Mind Electric
 Best Broken Beat Producer – Signal Drivers
 Best 4/4 Producer – Kriece
 Best Local Tune – Shockone – Don’t You Know
 Best Record Label – Destination?
 Best Club Night – Japan 4
 Best Regular Weeknight – Roller	
 Best Nightclub – Ambar
 Best Bar/Pub Venue – Rosemount
 Best Non-Club Venue – Belvoir
 Best Record Retailer – DJ Factory
 Best Radio Show – Full Frequency (RTRFM)
 Best Dance Music Website – Teknoscape
 Best All-Ages Rave – Commercial Resistance 2
 Best Event – Breakfest
 Best Flyer – Breakfest
 Best International Performance – Armin Van Buuren
 Outstanding Contribution – Boomtick

2006 Awards
The 2006 Award party was held on Sunday 3 December 2006 at the Rosemount Hotel. The Awards were hosted by MCs Dart & Blend, with entertainment provided by Bad Robot & David Lee Froth and performances by DJ Greg Packer, Ben Mac, Flaunt, DJ Armee, Terry Waites, and Scott & Mandy.
 Best House – DJ Terry Waites
 Best Techno – DJ Flaunt
 Best Drum'n'Bass – DJ Greg Packer
 Best Hip Hop – DJ Armee (Downsyde)
 Best Female – DJ Mystique
 Best Breaks – DJ Micah
 Best Progressive – DJ Jon Noonan
 Best Trance – DJ Jon Noonan
 Best Hard House – DJ Kenny L
 Best Hardcore – DJ Rousa
 Best New Talent – Karl Sav
 Best MC – Assassin
 Best Live Act – Fdel
 Best Hip Hop Act – Downsyde
 Best Producer – Bad Robot
 Best Local Tune – "Hang One Minute" Karl Sav
 Best Record Label – Kinematic
 Best Club Night – Destination
 Best Regular Weeknight – Roller
 Best Night Club – Ambar
 Best Non-Club Venue – Belvoir Amphitheatre
 Best Record Retailer – The DJ Factory
 Best Radio Show – Full Frequency (RTRFM)
 Best Dance Music Website – Teknoscape
 Best Rave Commercial – Resistance
 Best Event – Breakfest
 Best Flyer – Parklife
 Best International Performance – Pendulum
 Outstanding Contribution – Destination

2005 Awards
The 2005 Awards were held on Sunday 4 December 2005 at the Rosemount Hotel. The Awards were hosted by MCs Dart & Blend, with performances by Fdel, Micah, Mystique, Scott & Mandy, and Devo & Moemoney.
 Best House DJ – Adam Kelly
 Best Techno DJ – Flaunt
 Best Progressive DJ – Tigger
 Best Trance DJ – Kenny L
 Best Drum'n'Bass DJ – DJ Greg Packer
 Best Breaks DJ – Micah
 Best Hip Hop DJ – DJ Armee
 Best Female DJ – Mystique
 Best Hard House DJ – Kenny L
 Best Hardcore DJ – Rousa
 Best New Talent DJ – Kito
 Best MC – Assassin
 Best Live Act – Downsyde
 Best Hip Hop Act – Downsyde
 Best Producer – Pendulum
 Best Local Tune – "Rocksteady" Fdel
 Best Record Label – Kinematic
 Best Club Night – Trafik
 Best Regular Weeknight – Roller
 Best Night Club – Ambar
 Best Non-Club Venue – Belvoir Amphitheatre
 Best Record Retailer – DJ Factory
 Best Radio Show – Full Frequency (RTRFM)
 Best Dance Music Website – Teknoscape
 Best Rave – Fundamental
 Best Event – Breakfest
 Best Flyer – Parklife
 Best International Performance – Armin Van Buuren
 Outstanding Contribution – Boomtick

2004 Awards
 Best House DJ – Terry Waites
 Best Techno DJ – MRW
 Best Progressive DJ – Tigger
 Best Trance DJ – Simon Barwood
 Best Drum N Bass DJ – DJ Greg Packer
 Best Breaks DJ – Micah
 Best Hip Hop DJ – DJ Armee (Downsyde)
 Best Female DJ – Mystique
 Best Hard House DJ – Freestyle
 Best Hardcore DJ – Hutcho
 Best New Talent DJ – Signal Drivers
 Best MC – Assassin
 Best Live Act – Downsyde
 Best Hip Hop Act – Downsyde
 Best Producer – Greg Packer
 Best Local Tune – "Another Planet" – Pendulum
 Best Record Label – Interphase
 Best Club Night – Trafik
 Best Regular Weeknight – Roller
 Best Night Club – Ambar
 Best Non-Club Venue – Belvoir Amphitheatre
 Best Record Retailer – DJ Factory
 Best Radio Show – Full Frequency (RTRFM)
 Best Dance Music Website – Teknoscape
 Best Rave – Underground
 Best Event – Breakfest
 Best Flyer – Science Fiction
 Best International Performance – Armin Van Buuren
 Outstanding Contribution – Boomtick

2003 Awards
The 2003 Awards were held on Sunday 26 October 2003 at the Leederville Hotel. The Awards were hosted by Declan and Dart RTRFM's Full Frequency, with performances by Adam Kelly, MRW, Joby, Nic Tan, Souljah Armee, Dart, Micah, and Mandy.
 Best House DJ – Adam Kelly
 Best Techno DJ – MRW
 Best Progressive DJ – Tigger
 Best Trance DJ – Choice
 Best Drum 'n' Bass DJ – DJ Greg Packer
 Best Breaks DJ – Micah
 Best Hip-Hop DJ – DJ Armee (Downsyde)
 Best Female DJ – Mystique
 Best Hard House DJ – Freestyle
 Best Hardcore DJ – Hutcho
 Best New Talent – Jon Noonan
 Best MC – Assassin
 Best Live Act – Downsyde
 Best Hip-Hop Act – Downsyde
 Best Producer – Pendulum
 Best Local Tune – "Vault" (Pendulum)
 Best Record Label – Interphase
 Best Club Night – Trakik
 Best Regular Weeknight – Roller
 Best Nightclub – Ambar
 Best Non-Club Venue – Belvoir Amphitheatre
 Best Record Retailer – Central Station
 Best Radio Show – Full Frequency (RTRFM)
 Best Dance Music Website – Teknoscape
 Best All-Ages Rave – Mad For It
 Best Event – Breakfast
 Best Flyer – Science Fiction
 Best International Performance – LTJ Bukem

2001 Awards
 Best House DJ – Dan Stinton
 Best Techno DJ – Mrw
 Best Trance / Progressive DJ – Adam Kelly
 Best Hard House / Hard Dance DJ – Freestyle
 Best Drum 'n' Bass DJ – DJ Greg Packer
 Best Breaks / 2-Step DJ – Trent C
 Best Rave / Hardcore DJ – Hutcho
 Best New Talent (new category) – Nic Tan
 Best MC – Assassin
 Best Live Act – Rhibosome
 Best Producer (new category) – Greg Packer
 Best Record Label: Interphaze
 Best Nightclub – The Drum Club
 Best Non-Club Venue – The Swan Barracks
 Best Record Retailer – Central Station
 Best Radio Show – Full Frequency (RTRFM)
 Best Free Magazine – Hype Magazine
 Best Dance Music Website – Teknoscape
 Best All-Ages Rave: – Blackout 2
 Best Event – Gatecrasher Festival
 Best Flyer – Science Fiction
 Best International Performance – De La Soul

2000 Awards
 Best House DJ – DJ Dirty Den
 Best Techno / Tech-house DJ – DJ Puff
 Best Rave DJ – DJ Greg Packer
 Best Drum 'n' Bass DJ: DJ Greg Packer
 Best MC: Interjecta
 Best Non-Club Venue – Swan Barracks
 Best Nightclub – Globe Entertainment Complex
 Best Record Retailer – Central Station
 Best Local Record Label – Hard Afro
 Best Local Radio Show – Full Frequency (RTRFM)
 Best Free Magazine – Hype Magazine
 Best All Ages Rave – Blackout
 Best Event – Delirious Summer Festival
 Best Flyer – Delirious Summer Festival
 Best International DJ Set – Jeff Mills

1999 Awards
 Best House DJ – Dirty Den
 Best Techno/Tech-house DJ – DJ MRW
 Best Hardcore DJ – DJ Kevin
 Best Drum'n'Bass DJ – DJ Greg Packer
 Best MC – MC Interjecta
 Best Non-Club Venue – Belmont Race Course
 Best Nightclub – The Globe
 Best Record Retailer – Central Station
 Best Local Record Label – Hardline Recordings
 Best Local Radio Show – Full Frequency (RTRFM)
 Best Free Magazine – Hype Magazine
 Best All Ages Rave – Atom One
 Best 18+ Dance Party – Science Fiction NYE
 Best Flyer – Atom One
 Best International DJ Set – DJ Heaven

1998 Awards
 Best House/Trance DJ – MRW
 Best Jungle DJ – DJ Greg Packer
 Best Hardcore DJ – DJ Greg Packer
 Best Happy Hard DJ – DJ Kevin
 Best MC – MC Kevin
 Best Radio DJ – Echoic (RTRFM)
 Best Radio Show – Full Frequency (RTRFM)
 Best Non-Club Venue – Embassy Ballroom
 Best Nightclub – Globe
 Best Record Shop – Central Station
 Best Local Record Label – Hardline Rekordingz
 Best Event – Sonik '98
 Best Flyer – Sonik '98
 Best Promotion Team – Delirium Promotions

References

External links
 Main Website
 Teknoscape

Australian music awards
Electronic music organizations
Culture in Perth, Western Australia
Awards established in 1998
1998 establishments in Australia